Augustine Mahlonoko (born 17 August 2001) is a South African professional footballer who plays as a midfielder for La Masia. He is a graduate of the Orlando Pirates academy and became the club's youngest ever debutant in August 2018 before being released two years later.

Club career

Orlando Pirates
Mahlonoko began his footballing career with Orlando Pirates where he excelled for the club's academy and captained their MultiChoice Diski Challenge side. In 2018, he won the club's Development Player of the Season award and was part of the u-21 side which traveled to Brazil for the Project X tournament. His performances during the tournament impressed first-team coach Milutin Sredojević who subsequently included him in the club's pre-season tour of Zambia. His rapid rise to prominence continued and on 3 August, despite not having played a single match for the club's reserve side, he was promoted to the first team permanently ahead of the 2018–19 PSL campaign. He made his debut the following day, coming on as a late substitute in a 1–1 draw with Highlands Park. Upon entering the field of play, Mahlonoko broke the record set by Lyle Foster the season before for the youngest player to debut for Orlando Pirates, doing so at the age of 16 years and 352 days. The following season, he was demoted to the club's reserve team before being released from his contract in July 2020.

Baroka
He joined Baroka on a three-year contract in September 2020.

Career statistics

Club
 

1 Includes Nedbank Cup matches.
2 Includes Telkom Knockout matches.
3 Includes CAF Champions League matches.
4 Includes MTN 8 matches.

Honours and achievements

Individual
 Orlando Pirates Development Player of the Year: 2018

Records

Orlando Pirates
 Youngest player: 16 years and 352 days

References

2001 births
Living people
South African soccer players
Association football midfielders
Orlando Pirates F.C. players
Baroka F.C. players
Pretoria Callies F.C. players
South African Premier Division players
National First Division players